Donald K. Tarlton, CM (born 12 May 1943) is a Canadian record producer and promoter. He promoted many concerts and Canadian musicians under the name Donald K. Donald.

Early life and education
Tarlton graduated from Rosemere High School in the Montreal area and then attended Sir George Williams University (now Concordia University). His interest in entertainment promotion began in his youth.

Career
In 1966 Tarlton founded Donald K. Donald Productions, a concert promotion and booking company.

Tarlton was one of several people who founded the Montreal-based Aquarius Records, noted for artists such as April Wine, Corey Hart and Sum 41.

Tarlton has also been an occasional theatre promoter in America, including the Tony Award-winning Black and Blue and Tango Argentino.

In 1998, Tarlton founded the music industry promotion company Le Groupe DKD and founded several new music labels.

Awards and recognition
 1982: Félix Award, Producer of the Year
 1989: Tony Awards, Nomination, Best Musical "Black and Blue" 
 2000: Appointed Member of the Order of Canada
 2007: Walt Grealis Special Achievement Award, presented at the Juno Awards
 2015: SOCAN Special Achievement Award

References

External links
Le Groupe DKD (The Donald K Donald Entertainment Group)
Encyclopedia of Music in Canada: Donald K. Donald

1943 births
Anglophone Quebec people
Aquarius Records (Canada) artists
Businesspeople from Montreal
Canadian record producers
Impresarios
Living people
Members of the Order of Canada
Sir George Williams University alumni